Infanta Sofía of Spain (Sofía de Todos los Santos de Borbón y Ortiz; born 29 April 2007) is the younger daughter of King Felipe VI and Queen Letizia. She has an elder sister, Leonor, whom she follows in the line of succession to the  Spanish throne.

Biography
Infanta Sofía was born on 29 April 2007 at 16:50 in the Ruber International Hospital in Madrid by means of a caesarean section, two days after due date. Like her elder sister, her birth was announced by the royal family to the press via SMS. It was announced that her umbilical cord stem cells would be sent to a European private bank in Belgium and to a Spanish public one. The parents, then the Prince and Princess of Asturias, did the same with Leonor's cells: they were taken to a private center in Arizona, which caused controversy in Spain.

Sofía was named after her paternal grandmother, Queen Sofía of Spain. She was christened on 15 July by the Archbishop of Madrid, Antonio María Rouco Varela, in the gardens of the Palacio de la Zarzuela. Her godparents are Paloma Rocasolano (her maternal grandmother) and Konstantin, Prince of Vidin.

She received her First Communion on 17 May 2017 at the parish Asunción de Nuestra Señora, and was accompanied by her parents, her older sister, her grandparents, her maternal great-grandmother Menchu Álvarez del Valle, her step-grandmother Ana Togores, and her godfather Konstantin-Assen of Bulgaria, Prince of Vidin.

Title and style
Since her birth, Sofía has been an Infanta of Spain, with the style of Her Royal Highness, but not Princesa as only the heir presumptive of Spain is allowed to carry that title.

Sofía's full title is Her Royal Highness Sofía de Todos los Santos de Borbón y Ortiz, Infanta of Spain.

See also 

 Princess of Asturias Awards
 Politics of Spain

References

External links 

 Official website

2007 births
Living people
House of Bourbon (Spain)
Felipe VI of Spain
Nobility from Madrid
Royal children
Spanish infantas
Daughters of kings